Ni Wen-ya (2 March 1903 – 3 June 2006) was a longtime member of the Legislative Yuan, a parliamentary body first based in the Republic of China, and later moved to Taiwan.

Biography 
Ni was born in Yueqing, Zhejiang, Qing China. He studied for his master's degree at Columbia University in the United States and taught at Great China University.

Ni was elected to represent Zhejiang in the parliament through the 1947 legislative elections. Ni served as Vice President of the Legislative Yuan, before replacing Huang Guo-shu in the top leadership position as Huang had resigned due to health reasons. Ni was replaced as President of the Yuan by Liu Kuo-tsai in October 1988 when he first attempted to resign, but did not relinquish his legislative seat until December 1988, when his resignation was approved.

Personal life 
Ni was married to Shirley Kuo. 
Ni died on 3 June 2006 at Cathay General Hospital in Taipei, Taiwan.

References

Taiwanese centenarians
2006 deaths
1903 births
Kuomintang Members of the Legislative Yuan in Taiwan
Members of the 1st Legislative Yuan
Members of the 1st Legislative Yuan in Taiwan
Republic of China politicians from Zhejiang
Taiwanese Presidents of the Legislative Yuan
Academic staff of the East China Normal University
Columbia University alumni
Chinese centenarians
Men centenarians
Spouses of Taiwanese politicians